Scissurella georgica is a species of minute sea snail, a marine gastropod mollusk in the family Scissurellidae.

Description
The shell grows to a height of 1 mm.

Distribution
This species occurs in cold waters off South Georgia.

References

 Davolos J. & Moolenbeek R.G. 2005. The intertidal gastropods of South Georgia. Part I: Patellidae, Scissurellidae, Trochidae and Cerithiidae. Gloria Maris 44(6) : 128-145 
 Geiger D.L. (2012) Monograph of the little slit shells. Volume 1. Introduction, Scissurellidae. pp. 1-728. Volume 2. Anatomidae, Larocheidae, Depressizonidae, Sutilizonidae, Temnocinclidae. pp. 729–1291. Santa Barbara Museum of Natural History Monographs Number 7

External links

Scissurellidae
Gastropods described in 2005